Ibrahima Camará (born 25 January 1999) is a Guinean footballer who plays as a midfielder for Portuguese club Boavista.

Club career
On 7 July 2018, signed his first professional contract with Braga after 2 years in their academy. Camará made his professional debut for Braga B in a 1-0 LigaPro loss to G.D. Estoril Praia on 18 August 2018. On 1 February 2019, signed with Moreirense in the Primeira Liga.

On 30 August 2023, Camará signed a four-year contract with Boavista.

International career
Camará debuted for the Guinea national football team in a friendly 3–2 loss to Chile on 13 October 2019, and scored his side's second goal in the 80th minute.

International goals
Scores and results list Guinea's goal tally first.

References

External links

ZeroZero Profile

1999 births
Sportspeople from Conakry
Living people
Guinean footballers
Guinea international footballers
Association football midfielders
S.C. Braga B players
Moreirense F.C. players
Boavista F.C. players
Primeira Liga players
Liga Portugal 2 players
Guinean expatriate footballers
Guinean expatriate sportspeople in Portugal
Expatriate footballers in Portugal